William Doorn (March 16, 1901August 28, 1966) was a Michigan politician.

Early life
Doorn was born in the Netherlands on March 16, 1901.

Career
Doorn was elected to the position of mayor of Wyoming, Michigan in 1959. Later that same year, Doorn resigned this position. On November 8, 1966, Doorn was elected to the Michigan House of Representatives where he represented the Kent County 2nd district from January 11, 1961 to December 31, 1964. Doorn was not re-elected in 1964.

Personal life
Doorn was married and had two children.

Death
Doorn died on August 28, 1966.

References

1901 births
1966 deaths
Mayors of places in Michigan
Dutch emigrants to the United States
People from Wyoming, Michigan
Republican Party members of the Michigan House of Representatives
20th-century American politicians